Hánier Humberto Dranguet Castillo (born 2 September 1982) is a Cuban football defender, who currently plays for Ciego de Ávila.

Club career
The defender played a large part of his career for hometown club Guantánamo but left them for Ciego de Ávila in 2017.

International career
Dranguet made his international debut for Cuba in a June 2008 FIFA World Cup qualification match against Antigua & Barbuda and has earned a total of 38 caps, scoring 1 goal. He represented his country in 4 FIFA World Cup qualifying matches and played at the 2011 CONCACAF Gold Cup where he played in two matches.

International goals
Scores and results list Cuba's goal tally first.

References

External links
 

1982 births
Living people
Cuban footballers
Cuba international footballers
Association football defenders
FC Guantánamo players
FC Ciego de Ávila players
2011 CONCACAF Gold Cup players
2014 Caribbean Cup players
2015 CONCACAF Gold Cup players
Sportspeople from Guantánamo